Frédéric Chopin's Waltz No. 19 in A minor, B. 150, WN 63, KK IVb/11, P. 2/11, is a waltz for solo piano. The waltz was written sometime between 1847 and 1849, but was not published until 1860, after the composer's death, by Jacques Maho. At this time, it was attributed to Charlotte de Rothschild and was published as No. 3 of "Four pieces for piano". This collection also included Chopin's Nocturne in C minor, B. 108. It was not until 1955, 95 years after its initial publishing, that it was correctly attributed to Chopin.

Structure
This waltz is structured as a single movement in rondo form marked allegretto. It is one of Chopin's shortest and technically easiest waltzes.

Analysis
The piece shows great sadness, while enclosing some episodes that hint at happiness and hope. The first theme of the piece uses a simple but effective melody, conveying a sad portrait, with decorative ornaments used throughout. The second theme is more lively, punctuated by a brisk ascending arpeggio, although it still has a certain sadness. About halfway through the piece, there is a modulation into A major, featuring a happy and joyful melody. The piece concludes with the main theme, followed by a short coda.

References

External links

Waltzes by Frédéric Chopin
1848 compositions
Compositions in A minor
Compositions by Frédéric Chopin published posthumously